The Cana Island lighthouse is a lighthouse located just north of Baileys Harbor in Door County, Wisconsin, United States.

Along with the Baileys Harbor Range Lights, the lighthouse was built to replace the Baileys Harbor Lighthouse in 1869 and was first lit in 1870. It is still used as an active navigational aid under the jurisdiction of the United States Coast Guard, and was added to the National Register of Historic Places in 1976.

Since the 1970s, both the lighthouse and its keeper's quarters are open for visitors to tour by means of the Door County Maritime Museum.

History

The keeper's quarters, privy, and tower were the first buildings and were made of cream city brick, but the brick of the tower deteriorated quickly because of storms and icy winters. In 1902, a steel cladding was added to the tower to protect it from further deterioration. The cost of the quarters, tower and cladding was $12,793.

The light itself is a third order Fresnel lens. It used to be fueled by lard, later it was fueled by kerosene, then by acetylene, and now by electricity. The round ball at the top is the vent that removed the smoke and soot from the oil lamp. Each night oil had to be carried to the top of the tower  by the keeper or his assistant to keep the light fueled. When the light first became electric in 1945, it was by an engine driven, 2 kW generator, and batteries that powered the 100 watt, 32 volt bulb. A powerline was finally installed in the 1960s, and the bulb was switched to a 110 volt, 200 watt bulb. Four bulbs are mounted in a rack that allows for the next bulb to light if the one before it burns out.

An hexagon-shaped oil house, storage building and privy are also located at the site. An oil tank had been in the woods to the south of the building and a pipe underground moved the oil to the building.

The lighthouse is located on the  Cana Island connected to the mainland via a rocky channel.  Depending on the lake level the channel can be covered with 1–3 feet of cold Lake Michigan water. Originally, only wood walkways on top of rocks and a little dirt covered the area around the buildings. But starting in 1900, top soil was hauled in by a crew of men with eight teams of horses and wagons. Six weeks later they were ready to begin covering the area with grass. There is a stone sea wall on the east end of the island.

Before 1889, the first assistants were spouses or family members. Patrick Chambers was the first non-family member assistant. When electricity came to the island an assistant was no longer needed.

The stone foundation goes below ground  and is set on bedrock. Ten feet from the top it narrows to a  thickness with a  airspace and  inner layer. There are 102 cast iron steps in the circular staircase leading to the watch room.

On October 15, 1880 a terrible storm called the Big Blow of 1880 destroyed seven ships near this lighthouse, and on October 12, 1928, the freighter M.J. Bartelme went aground in the fog at this location after attempts to free the ship failed.

Keepers
William Jackson 1869-1872 (first keeper)
Julius Warren 1872-1875
William Sanderson 1875-1891
Jesse T. Brown 1891-1913
Conrad A. Stram 1913-1918
Oscar R. Knudsen 1918-1924
Michael Drezdon 1941-1945
Rosie and Louie Janda 1977-1995

Gallery

References

Further reading

 Havighurst, Walter (1943) The Long Ships Passing: The Story of the Great Lakes, Macmillan Publishers.
 Oleszewski, Wes, Great Lakes Lighthouses, American and Canadian: A Comprehensive Directory/Guide to Great Lakes Lighthouses, (Gwinn, Michigan: Avery Color Studios, Inc., 1998) .
 
 Sapulski, Wayne S., (2001) Lighthouses of Lake Michigan: Past and Present (Paperback) (Fowlerville: Wilderness Adventure Books) ; .
 Magill Weber, Cana Island Lighthouse description in Door County Outdoors: A Guide to the Best Hiking, Biking, Paddling, Beaches, and Natural Places Madison, Wisconsin: University of Wisconsin Press, 2011, page 169
 Wright, Larry and Wright, Patricia, Great Lakes Lighthouses Encyclopedia Hardback (Erin: Boston Mills Press, 2006) .
 Cana Island Lighthouse, Door County Facilities and Parks Department

External links

Cana Island Lighthouse - Door County Maritime Museum
Cana Island Light entry in Seeing the Light (Archived June 22, 2020)
Lighthouse friends article
NPS Inventory of Historic Light Stations - Wisconsin (Archived June 12, 2012)
Video tour of Cana Island Light

Lighthouses completed in 1869
Lighthouses in Door County, Wisconsin
Lighthouse museums in Wisconsin
Lighthouses on the National Register of Historic Places in Wisconsin
Museums in Door County, Wisconsin
1869 establishments in Wisconsin
National Register of Historic Places in Door County, Wisconsin